Computational Science & Discovery was a peer-reviewed scientific journal covering computational science in physics, chemistry, biology, and applied science. The editor-in-chief was Nathan A Baker (Pacific Northwest National Laboratory), who succeeded Anthony Mezzacappa (Oak Ridge National Laboratory) in 2011. The journal was established in 2008 and ceased publication in 2015, but all articles will remain available online.

Abstracting and indexing
This journal was indexed by the following services:
 Scopus
 Inspec
 Chemical Abstracts Service
 FLUIDEX
 International Nuclear Information System/Atomindex
 NASA Astrophysics Data System
 MathSciNet
 PASCAL

References

External links

Physics journals
IOP Publishing academic journals
Publications established in 2008
Publications disestablished in 2015
Open access journals
English-language journals